William Lawrence Wight III (born August 11, 1989) is an American author of fantasy literature. He is best known for his independently published Cradle series, which has topped the Amazon Kindle Store's bestseller list on multiple occasions and made the New York Times Best Seller list.  He is also known for his Traveler's Gate trilogy and Elder Empire series.

Early life 
Will Wight was born in Memphis, Tennessee, and received his B.A in 2011 and M.F.A in 2013 in Creative Writing from the University of Central Florida. He is the first of three siblings.

Career 
Will Wight began self-publishing novels in 2013 with the Traveler's Gate series, starting with the book House of Blades, which he wrote while earning his master's degree. He has stated his coursework during his degree was integral to helping him form the structure that he uses to write his books. House of Blades was so successful that Wight was able to become a full-time independent writer shortly after it was published. As his books grew more successful, he later founded Hidden Gnome Publishing as an independent business to handle publishing, merchandising, and other related activities. In 2022, he funded the publication of physical books through Kickstarter.

He is noted for being a successful self-published author, winning the Stabby Award for Best Self-Published/Independent Novel of 2013 on Reddit's r/Fantasy for his first book House of Blades. Wight subsequently won the same award two more times in 2018 for Ghostwater, and in 2019 for Underlord. Due to his number of wins, Wight was retired from eligibility for the awards in 2020. The audiobooks for Bloodline, Reaper, and Dreadgod made it to the New York Times Best Seller list for the month that they were released.

Wight is noted for taking inspiration from xianxia and wuxia literature, as part of the growing progression fantasy genre.

Biography

Novels 

All of Will Wight's novels take place in the same multiverse, but in different universes known as 'Iterations' which have different magic systems following similar underlying principles. An organization known as the Abidan is the primary force that maintains and manages these Iterations, although they have a strict policy of non-interference on day-to-day matters.

Traveler's Gate
On an Iteration called Amalgam, Travelers gain power from otherworldly Territories. The series centers on Simon, a boy who earns his power to save his friends and family. Soon, he finds himself caught in greater battles.

House of Blades, (2013)
The Crimson Vault, (2013)
City of Light, (2014)

Elder Empire
On the Iteration of Asylum, Elders are powerful, inhuman entities, held back by the Emperor of the Aurelian Empire. Upon his death, the balances of power begin to shift.

These books consist of two parallel series, each narrated from opposing viewpoints.

The Elder Empire: Shadow Books

Follows the path of Shera, an assassin, as she works to set the world free from corrupt rulers.

Of Shadow and Sea (2015)
Of Darkness and Dawn (2015)
Of Killers and Kings (2020)

The Elder Empire: Sea Books

Follows the journey of Calder Marten, captain of The Testament, as he works to restore the Empire.

Of Sea and Shadow (2015)
Of Dawn and Darkness (2016)
Of Kings and Killers (2020)

Cradle
On the Iteration known as Cradle, Wei Shi Lindon is born a weak Unsouled, forbidden to seek power as sacred artists do. However, he is faced with a looming fate that he must defy his family's rules to avoid. The Cradle series follows Lindon's journey as he forges a Path for himself. 

Unsouled (June 2016)
Soulsmith (September 2016)
Blackflame (August 2017)
Skysworn (September 2017)
Ghostwater (May 2018)
Underlord (March 2019)
Uncrowned (September 2019)
Wintersteel (October 2020)
Bloodline (April 2021)
Reaper (November 2021)
Dreadgod (July 2022)
Waybound (not yet released)

Short stories
 "The Savior of Garden's Gate" (2019) (in the Heroes Wanted Anthology)

References

External links 
Official Website
 
 Unsouled by Will Wight, March 13, 2020.
Will Wight entry on Goodreads

1989 births
Living people
21st-century American novelists
American fantasy writers